David Windridge (born 7 December 1961) is an English former professional footballer who played in the Football League, as a forward.

References

External links

1961 births
Living people
People from Atherstone
English footballers
Association football forwards
Sheffield United F.C. players
Chesterfield F.C. players
Blackpool F.C. players
Cork City F.C. players
Northwich Victoria F.C. players
Bury F.C. players
Rochdale A.F.C. players
Colne Dynamoes F.C. players
Morecambe F.C. players
English Football League players
National League (English football) players